Kyrylo Garashchenko (born 16 April 1998 in Zaporozhye) is a Ukrainian Paralympic swimmer. At the 2020 Summer Paralympics, he won silver in the men's 400 metre freestyle S13 event, and bronze in the mixed 4 × 100 metre freestyle relay 49pts event.

References

External links
 

1998 births
Living people
Ukrainian male freestyle swimmers
Paralympic swimmers of Ukraine
Paralympic silver medalists for Ukraine
Paralympic bronze medalists for Ukraine
Paralympic medalists in swimming
Swimmers at the 2020 Summer Paralympics
Medalists at the 2020 Summer Paralympics
Sportspeople from Zaporizhzhia
European Games competitors for Ukraine
Swimmers at the 2015 European Games
S13-classified Paralympic swimmers
Medalists at the World Para Swimming Championships
21st-century Ukrainian people